Sione Vailanu (born 27 January 1995) is a Tongan No.8 rugby union player who plays for United Rugby Championship side Glasgow Warriors. He previously played for Wasps, Saracens and Worcester Warriors after being a sevens player in Japan.

Sione's early career consisted of 4 years of playing rugby sevens in Japan with the Asahi University.  While he was playing in Japan he was scouted by Afa Hanipale who recommended him to invitational team Samurai RFC.  Sione was invited to play for Samurai RFC at the Hong Kong 10s tournament in 2017

It was at the Hong Kong 10s, playing for Samurai RFC, that he impressed the then Saracens Academy Director Donald Barrell.  Barrell was with Samurai RFC as their forwards coach and following a successful tournament approached Sione with a view to moving to Saracens.

It was his performance here that led to joining the Tongan national team "Ikale Tahi" for two games, against Japan and Romania, with a defeat and victory respectively. Along with several other members of the Tongan team, he chose to depart from national duty early in order to ease the mid-season joining in England.

Sione joined Saracens at the beginning of January 2018 to act both as injury and international call-up cover, with an initial contract to the end of the 2018/19 season. Several injuries, including to his hand, would limit him to four games across all Saracens' competitions in the remainder of the 2017/18 season.

In February 2019, Sione announced his signing by Wasps, in order to receive more game time and to partially fill the position vacated by Nathan Hughes who departed at the conclusion of the 2018/19 season.

In April 2021, Worcester Warriors announced that Vailanu would be joining them at Sixways Stadium on a two-year contract.

References

External links

Saracens F.C. players
Rugby union number eights
1995 births
Living people
Asahi University alumni
Tongan rugby union players
Tonga international rugby union players
Rugby union flankers
Wasps RFC players
Worcester Warriors players
Glasgow Warriors players